This is a list of the tallest structures in the Iran. The list contains all types of structures.

List

See also
List of tallest buildings in Iran
List of tallest buildings in Tehran

References

Tallest
Iran